"You're Nobody till Somebody Loves You" is a popular song written by Russ Morgan, Larry Stock, and James Cavanaugh and published in 1944.
The song was first recorded by Morgan and was a hit for him in 1946, reaching the No. 14 spot in the charts. The best known version was Dean Martin's, which was released in 1960 and reissued in 1964.

Dean Martin cover version 
The best known is the version by Dean Martin, who recorded it for Capitol Records in 1960 and Reprise Records in 1964. Dean Martin's 1964 version spent 9 weeks on the Billboard Hot 100 chart, peaking at No. 25, while reaching No. 1 on Billboards Middle-Road Singles chart, and No. 28 on Canada's CHUM Hit Parade.

Other cover versions 
It has been covered by numerous artists, including:
Steve Conway (1946)
The Mills Brothers (1954)
Sam Cooke (1964)
It was the B-side to Frankie Vaughan's hit single "There Must Be a Way", which broke into the UK top ten in 1967.
Dora Hall did a disco cover of the song, which appeared on her album Dora Hall Sings Disco.
Ray Price covered the song in 1986, and the single peaked at number 60 on the Billboard Hot Country Singles chart.
English songwriter Rick Astley released in 2005 a cover version for his 6th studio album Portrait, on the Japanese release only.

See also
List of number-one adult contemporary singles of 1965 (U.S.)

References

1944 songs
1964 singles
1986 singles
Songs written by Russ Morgan
Songs written by Larry Stock
Dean Martin songs
Ray Price (musician) songs
Reprise Records singles